Arkavazi or Arkwazi is a Kurdish tribe from western Iran and northeastern Iraq.

History
The Arkavazis are located mainly in the areas of Ilam, Eslamabad-e Gharb, Kermanshah, Khanaqin, Mandali, and its center is Chavar. The cities of Chavar and Arkavaz are almost entirely populated by Arkavazis. Arkavazis primarily speak Southern Kurdish and follow Shia Islam. Among the notable people of this tribe is the poet Khulam Rada Khan Arkawazi,

See also
 Feyli
 Kalhor
 Kurdish tribes

References

Diyala Governorate
Ilam Province
Kermanshah Province
Kurdish tribes
Shia communities
Iranian Kurdistan
Iraqi Kurdistan